Martina Barber (born 12 May 1995) is a British Paralympic athlete who competes in mainly long jump events at international level events. She has won two gold medals for Great Britain at the INAS World Athletics Championships and European Championships in heptathlon.

References

1995 births
Living people
People from Stevenage
Paralympic athletes of Great Britain
British female long jumpers
British female hurdlers
British heptathletes